The Quartermaster Hall of Fame Program is to recognize individuals who have made significant contributions to the Quartermaster Corps. It was established in November 1985 as part of the Quartermaster Regimental honors program. The Hall of Fame in Mifflin Hall at Fort Lee, VA was opened on 12 June 1986. New inductees are selected every year, with the ceremony held annually.

Inductees  
 Richard Napoleon Batchelder
 John Cusick
 Ann E. Dunwoody
 Carl H. Freeman
 Nathanael Greene
 Edmund B. Gregory
 Terence Hildner
 Rufus Ingalls
 Thomas Jesup
 Montgomery C. Meigs
 Thomas Mifflin
 Timothy Pickering
 Henry Granville Sharpe
 Ralph Siu
 Henry Gene Skeen
 Billy K. Solomon
 Richard Horner Thompson
 Paul J. Vanderploog
 Warren Whitside
 Joseph W. Brundy, III

Notes

Halls of fame in Virginia
Hall of Fame
Awards established in 1985
1985 establishments in Virginia